Süleyman Turan (19 November 1936 – 10 September 2019) was a Turkish film and theater actor.

Süleyman Turan died at the age of 82 in Istanbul on 10 September 2019. Following the religious funeral service held at Şakirin Mosque, he was interred at Karacaahmet Cemetery. He was survived by his daughter Beliz Turan.

Selected filmography

Awards
 Golden Orange Award for Best Supporting Actor (1972)
 Golden Orange Life Achievement Award (2003)

References

External links 

1936 births
2019 deaths
Turkish male film actors
Male actors from Istanbul
Best Supporting Actor Golden Orange Award winners
Golden Orange Life Achievement Award winners
Burials at Karacaahmet Cemetery